SPLASH is a programming language-related conference held since 2011, sponsored by the SIGPLAN special interest group of the Association for Computing Machinery (ACM). Its name is an acronym for Systems, Programming, Languages, and Applications: Software for Humanity. SPLASH is an umbrella conference for two longstanding conferences, OOPSLA and Onward! which are now tracks of SPLASH.

SPLASH conferences held so far have been:
 Sparks, Nevada, October 17–21, 2010
 Portland, Oregon, October 22–27, 2011
 Tucson, Arizona, October 19–25, 2012
 Indianapolis, Indiana, October 26–31, 2013
 Portland, Oregon, October 20–24, 2014
 Pittsburgh, Pennsylvania, October 25–30, 2015
 Amsterdam, Netherlands, October 30 - November 4, 2016
 Vancouver, British Columbia, Canada, October 22–27, 2017
 Boston, Massachusetts, November 4–9, 2018
 Athens, Greece, October 20-25, 2019
 Virtual, November 15-21, 2020
 Chicago, Illinois, October 17-25, 2021
 Auckland, New Zealand, December 5-10, 2022

Upcoming SPLASH conferences:
 Cascais, Portugal, October 22-27, 2023

References

External links
Official SPLASH website
History of the conference

Computer science conferences
Association for Computing Machinery conferences
Programming languages conferences